There are at least 8 named lakes and reservoirs in Musselshell County, Montana.

Lakes
 Busse Water, el. 
 Des Moines Lakes, el. 
 Devils Hole Lake, el. 
 Lake Thom, el. 
 May Martin Lake, el. 
 Miller Lake, el. 
 Talbot Lake, el.

Reservoirs
 Lake Mason, el.

See also
 List of lakes in Montana

Notes

Bodies of water of Musselshell County, Montana
Musselshell